Xanthocosmia is a genus of moths of the family Noctuidae.

Species
 Xanthocosmia jankowskii (Oberthür, 1884)

References
Natural History Museum Lepidoptera genus database
Xanthocosmia at funet

Hadeninae